BC Šiauliai is the professional basketball club of Šiauliai, Lithuania. The club competes in the Lithuanian Basketball League. It has won the 3rd place award (behind Lithuanian basketball giants Lietuvos Rytas and Žalgiris) in the LKL a record 9 times.

History

BC Kelininkas (1982–1994)

The team was formed in 1984 and participated in the second-tier Lithuanian league. Following Tauras Šiauliai club bankrupt, BC Kelininkas became city's primary basketball club. During the 1994–95 season in LKAL, BC Kelininkas played his last season under this name. BC Kelininkas, led by Antanas Sireika, Robertas Giedraitis, Donatas Slanina and Mindaugas Žukauskas, finished with the 18–2 regular season record and advanced into the playoffs. There they successfully completed two stages by overcoming Banga Kaunas and SAVY Vilnius. Though, later they were defeated by Vilnius LPA twice. Then BC Kelininkas, due to the sponsorship reasons, was renamed to BC Šiauliai.

First victories and titles (1994–2003)

In June, 1994 Adomas Klimavičius and Šiaulių plentas company chief engineer Algimantas Mikšys participated in the LKL board meeting, where they presented filmed material about Šiauliai city infrastructure, budget, team roster and coaches. Then the board members voted: ten members from thirteen voted for BC Šiauliai request acceptance to join LKL. The team successfully joined LKL and was coached by Antanas Sireika.

After two loses to Lavera Kaunas and Statyba Vilnius, BC Šiauliai returned home. During the first game in Tauras Sports Hall, BC Šiauliai achieved club's first victory in LKL versus NECA Kaunas 93–75. Oleg Bulancev scored 25 points, Mindaugas Žukauskas – 18 points, Arvydas Tamkevičius added 17 points back then.

Following successful debut season in LKL, where they finished 4th, the club achieved the right to participate in the 1995–96 FIBA Korać Cup tournament. The sorcery told that their first opponent will be Śląsk Wrocław from Poland. BC Šiauliai showed extraordinary fighting efficiency in the second half and defeated the Polish team 100–88, thanks to the solid 24-points performance by Giedrius Pečiulionis.

BC Šiauliai won the 32nd Lithuanian men's basketball cup. The team joined the tournament in the third stage where they defeated Olimpas Plungė twice. The final four took place in Šiauliai. In the semi-final BC Šiauliai overcome BC Šilutė 83–68 and in the final, after a spirited battle, they won versus Statyba Vilnius 96–88.

On April 1, 1996, Mindaugas Žukauskas has performed a record appearance, when BC Šiauliai met the regular season winners Atletas Kaunas in the LKL quarter-final. Žukauskas led his hometown team to the 91–86 victory by scoring 45 points (11 two-pointers, 5 three-pointers and 8 free-throws). This astonishing performance remains unimproved until the nowadays.

The 1998 LKF Cup Final Four was hosted in Šiauliai and the team was willing to defend their last season' golden title at any costs. Though, they were overshadowed by the newly formed Lietuvos rytas-Statyba Vilnius 65–72.

During the 1999–00 LKL season, BC Šiauliai won their first-ever LKL bronze medals by reaching the 3–1 revenge versus Sakalai Vilnius, who crushed their bronze dreams previous season. First series game, which BC Šiauliai unexpectedly won 77–62 in Vilnius, is regarded as crucial. The series ended 3–1.

Another record performance happened on March 3, 2001, when Giedrius Pečiulionis realized 11 three-pointers from 16 versus BC Panevėžys. Totally, Pečiulionis scored 41 points that night and led BC Šiauliai to the excellent 107–69 triumph. This performance was just 2 three-pointers behind from the LKL record of 13 three-pointers held by Joey Vickery since 1996, and is the second result in the whole LKL history. Third result of 10 three-pointers per one game is also held by Giedrius Pečiulionis since 1998.

During the 2000–01 season, BC Šiauliai achieved the LKL all-time scoring record of 143 points versus BC Suvalkija in Marijampolė. Totally, BC Šiauliai players realized 49 two-pointers with the stunning 86% accuracy and 39 free-throws. In the same season BC Šiauliai won their second consecutive LKL bronze medals, winning series 3–1 versus Alita Alytus. The final victorious 62–97 match was played in Alytus.

BC Šiauliai failed to extend their bronze medals streak this time, losing the LKL bronze series 2–3 in 2002 and 1–3 in 2003 to Alita Alytus. Although, that was just a silence before the true storm.

True LKL bronze domination (2004–2010)

During the 2003–04 season, BC Šiauliai returned to the bronze LKL throne, defeating Sakalai Vilnius 3–2 in the final series game 84–78.

Next season they totally won 3 bronze medals in three different competitions. First of all, BC Šiauliai participated in the FIBA Europe cup Final Four, held in Moscow. They were crushed 94–57 by Lokomotiv Rostov in the semi-final, though they successfully rehabilitated next day with the 86–71 victory over EURAS Ekaterinburg and were decorated with the season' first bronze medals. Secondly, they continued their solid season in Baltic Basketball League, reaching the semi-final. They failed to overcome the legendary Lithuanian club Žalgiris Kaunas there, losing 89–61, but were able to defeat BK Ventspils 97–87 and won their second bronze medals that season. Astonishing season ended with the 3–1 series triumph over Sakalai Vilnius during the LKL bronze final, winning the club's fourth LKL bronze medals.

In the 2005–06 season, BC Šiauliai once again won BBL bronze medals, defeating Nevėžis Kėdainiai 76–59. That day the team was led by Tadas Klimavičius (12 points, 15 rebounds) and Artūras Jomantas (20 points, 8 rebounds, 4 assists and steals). The team also won their fifth LKL bronze medals after sweeping Nevėžis Kėdainiai 3–0. All the series victories were achieved with the average of 15.7 points.

During the 2006–07 season, the club won their sixth bronze medals, defeating Neptūnas Klaipėda 3–0 as well. Though, this time two away games were won respectively by only two and three points.

Before the 2007–08 season, BC Šiauliai club moved to their newly built 5,700 seats Šiauliai Arena. First official game there was played on September 28, 2007, versus Aisčiai-Atletas, winning it 73–61. That season they won the LKF Cup bronze medals for the first time, losing to the Euroleague participant Lietuvos rytas Vilnius only 66–71 in the semi-final, but confidently defeating Neptūnas Klaipėda 111–92 for the bronze. The final four was held in Šiauliai. BC Šiauliai also won their seventh LKL bronze medals, after smashing BC Alytus 3–0. The team has shown impressive sports form with 95.7 points per game in the series.

In the 2008–09 season BC Šiauliai won their second LKF Cup bronze medals. In the semi-final they once again lost to Lietuvos rytas Vilnius 94–66, but overcome Aisčiai Kaunas team, which was led by Donatas Motiejūnas, to win the bronze 97–89. Records times returned for BC Šiauliai when Andrius Šležas participated in the 2009 LKL Three-point Shootout contest. During the tournament semi-final, he accurately made 27 of 30 three-pointers and achieved the tournament record, which is unimproved until the nowadays. Although, Šležas never won the title, despite competing in the contest three times. In the spring of 2009, they qualified for the LKL bronze final once again. BC Šiauliai won first two series games after OT with identical result of 101–93. Though, Neptūnas did not gave up after first two exhausting games and won two consecutive games as well: 90–95 and 78–75. BC Šiauliai secured their bronze title in the fifth series game, defeating Neptūnas 80–73, and winning their eighth victorious LKL bronze medals series 3–2.

BC Šiauliai firmly expanded their bronze medals collection in the 2009–10 season. As year before, they began with the LKF Cup bronze, winning versus Nevėžis Kėdainiai 76–79. Derrick Low (23 points, 6 assists) and Deividas Gailius (21 points) led BC Šiauliai to the close victory back then. Derrick Low also participated in the 2010 LKL Three-point Shootout contest, winning first such title for the club. In the tournament final he scored 22 points and outperformed Adas Juškevičius who scored 21. BC Šiauliai won another thriller 84–83 in the BBL bronze final versus BK Ventspils after Vytautas Šarakauskas buzzer-beater. The referees counted it in, however BK Ventspils submitted a protest by telling that it was made after time. BBL accepted their protest and decided to rematch the game on Sunday. Though, BK Ventspils club did not show up in the game and technically lost it 20–0. BC Šiauliai players were awarded with the club's third BBL bronze medals set. They also captured their season' third bronze medals in the LKL bronze final by defeating Juventus Utena in the third series game 87–67, winning the series 3–0. It was the club's seventh straight LKL bronze medals set. Following the outstanding season ending, team leader Mindaugas Kuzminskas, who averaged 16.7 points and 6 rebounds per game in LKL, signed with the legendary Žalgiris Kaunas.

Tough times (2011–2013)

After seven solid seasons, BC Šiauliai had difficult times during the next three. Edvinas Ruzgas won the 2011 LKL Three-point Shootout contest, however it was the only title BC Šiauliai received that season. The club achieved only 7th spot in the BBL that season. Furthermore, they also surprisingly lost the LKL quarter-final to Juventus Utena and did not qualify into the Eurocup, staying without the European competitions for the first time after nine consecutive seasons.

BC Šiauliai returned to the BBL bronze final during the 2011–12 BBL season, but they were defeated by VEF Rīga there. The team finished 3rd during the 2011–12 LKL regular season and advanced into the LKL bronze final, though they were crushed 3–1 there by Rūdupis Prienai.

The 2012–13 season was another dark spot for the BC Šiauliai club history. Firstly, they were eliminated in the quarter-final of BBL by BK Ventspils due to the unfavorable points ratio as they lost the second series game 80–87 and the first game was won only by 3 points (81–78). It was the club's all-time worst performance in BBL. In the 2012–13 LKL regular season they finished only 6th and were defeated by BC Prienai once again, this time – at the quarter-final 2–0.

BBL champions (2013–2016)

Following the three completely dry seasons, BC Šiauliai started expanding their trophies collection again. First of all, Travis Leslie won the 2014 LKL Slam Dunk Contest by performing tremendous dunks. He also led Šiauliai to the 2013–14 Baltic Basketball League title and was named MVP twice: in the regular season and in the finals. Despite that, BC Šiauliai were eliminated in the LKL quarter-final again by the future finalist Neptūnas Klaipėda. Travis Leslie joined Lietuvos rytas Vilnius after this season and won the LKL Slam Dunk Contest again by dunking over Mercedes-Benz and Grigorij Khizhnyak. BC Šiauliai retained their BBL title by defeating BK Ventspils in the finals 2–0 during the following season. Second game, which was won 88–80, required OT. Gintaras Leonavičius was named MVP of the tournament. BC Šiauliai also recovered their LKF Cup bronze title that season. However, the 2014–15 LKL season playoffs ended early for them, after being eliminated in the quarter-final for the third straight season, this time – by Lietuvos rytas Vilnius 3–0. Following the end of the season, two BC Šiauliai players: Rokas Giedraitis and Julius Jucikas joined Rytas.

On July 29, 2015, the club was invited to join the 2015–16 FIBA Europe Cup tournament, which is the alternative version of the 2nd tier European tournament Eurocup, organized by FIBA. Though, the team did not advance into the second stage of the FIBA Europe Cup due to the unfavorable points difference. On April 6, 2016, the team won their third BBL title in a row. In the LKL, the club lost a tough series to future finalist BC Neptūnas 1:3, despite strong efforts from the returning Rokas Giedraitis, who was loaned to the team by Lietuvos rytas.

Decline and comeback (2016–present)
The 2016–2017 season, however, became one of the worst nightmares in club history. Coach Petrauskas left the team, and was replaced by longtime former player and assistant coach Vaidas Pauliukėnas. The team also left the BBL, but participated in the BBL Cup tournament (finishing 4th). Due to poor financial situation, many players left the club, resulting in the team plummeting to the bottom of the LKL, and in the 2016–17 FIBA Europe Cup, where Šiauliai lost all 6 games. Longtime president Adomas Klimavičius resigned, and was replaced by former player Mindaugas Žukauskas. Financial problems and scandals plagued the team. Despite some improvement by the end of the season, in large part due to great performances by Martynas Echodas, Šiauliai still finished in last place in the LKL - the team's worst season in history.

Antanas Sireika, legendary coach of the team, was announced as the coach for the 2017–18 season. Šiauliai then signed players like Nick Zeisloft, whose many clutch baskets helped during the season, Arminas Urbutis and the returning Vytautas Šarakauskas, re-signed point guard Donatas Sabeckis and loaned Laurynas Birutis, a talented young center, from BC Žalgiris. Šiauliai also returned to the Baltic Basketball League. Šiauliai initially struggled, including an 8-game losing streak at the start of the season, leading to many fans remembering the poor 2017 season. By March, the team had completely recovered, winning 9 of their last 14 games, including upset victory at home over Žalgiris 93:90, and two wins over BC Neptūnas 78:71 in Klaipėda and 77:76 at home. A blowout win over BC Lietkabelis, last year's LKL finalist, 87:65, helped the team secure 5th place. In the LKL quarterfinals, returning after a one-year absence, Šiauliai faced the same Lietkabelis team. The young team could not overcome the veteran leadership of Lietkabelis, and lost the series 1:3, though ending the season on a positive note. In the 2018 Karaliaus Mindaugo taurė, Šiauliai faced champion Žalgiris Kaunas, and led by an amazing performance by Birutis, who scored 35 points and had 11 rebounds, fought the champions to the limit, losing only in the end 78:85. In the Baltic Basketball League, to which the team returned after a season absence, Šiauliai was one of the best teams all season, tying first place with BK Jūrmala in regular season group play. In the quarterfinals, Šiauliai defeated BK Ogre on aggregate, 175:162 (78:75 at home and 97:87 away), before facing tournament favorite BC Pieno žvaigždės in the semifinals. The young Šiauliai team lost the series on aggregate, 148:159 (84:91 at home and 64:68 away) to Pieno žvaigždės, who went on to win the BBL. In the 3rd place matchup, Šiauliai faced BC Tartu, and won the first game in Tartu 88:86, but lost in a huge upset at home 70:78 and lost on aggregate, 158:164, leaving the 3 time BBL champions with a disappointing 4th-place finish.

Over the next to seasons, 2018-2019 and 2019–2020, Šiauliai did not have the same amounts of success. Team leaders like Birutis, Sabeckis and Zeisloft left the team. Šiauliai finished last in 2019, though did improve in 2020, finishing in 8th place. Many players, like Karolis Lukošiūnas, Ignas Vaitkus, Rokas Gustys and Evaldas Šaulys, moved on to top teams in the LKL after successful individual seasons with Šiauliai. In the 2020-2021 season, Šiauliai, led by LKL season MVP Elvar Már Friðriksson, Andy Van Vliet, Arminas Urbutis, Kaspars Bērziņš, Martynas Varnas and veteran Mindaugas Lukauskis, finished 7th in the LKL. Friðriksson in particular had many great performances for Šiauliai. 

The 2021-2022 season was the return among the LKL elite for Šiauliai. Coach Sireika remained with the team, and the team, lead by Jon Elmore, managed to reach the LKL semifinals for the first time since the 2011-2012 season, by defeating CBet Jonava 3-1 in the first round of the LKL playoffs. In the semifinals, Šiauliai lost to Rytas Vilnius 1-3 in the semifinals, but not before giving the best fight they can to the team that later won the LKL championship. Playing in the bronze medal series, Šiauliai faced Žalgiris Kaunas, who missed the LKL finals for the first time in LKL history, and lost the series 0-4. Šiauliai also reached the semifinals of the King Mindaugas Cup for the first time since the 2014-2015 season, and was runner-up in the newly established 2021–22 European North Basketball League, where Šiauliai lost to Anwil Włocławek in the finals.

Players

Retired numbers
BC Šiauliai has three retired numbers of players who had significant influence in the team's results previously.

Current roster

Depth chart

Squad changes for/during 2022–23 season

In

|}

Out

|}

Logos

Season by season

Detailed information of former rosters and results.

League attendances
This is a list of league games attendances of BC Siauliai at Šiauliai Arena.

Head coaches

Last updated: 2017-06-19.

Club players records

Last updated: 2015-08-14.

Notable players
To appear in this section a player must be either:
 A player who has played at least 3 seasons (if foreign player) or 5 seasons (if Lithuanian player) for the club.
 A player who has won individual award.
 A Lithuanian player who has played for the Lithuanian national basketball team.
 A foreign international player who had significantly contributed into the results of the club.
 A Lithuanian player who had significantly contributed into the results of the club.

 Lithuania:
 Martynas Andriukaitis 2003–2004
 Rolandas Alijevas 2012–2013, 2014–2015
 Sigitas Birutis 1994–2001
 Arvydas Čepulis 1997–2000, 2001–2005, 2006–2007, 2010, 2016-present
 Audrius Danusevičius 1997–1999, 2000–2002, 2003–2008, 2009
 Robertas Giedraitis 1994–2006
 Rokas Giedraitis 2013–2015
 Ovidijus Galdikas 2012–2014
 Deividas Gailius 2009–2010
 Andrius Giedraitis 1997
 Darius Gvezdauskas 2010–2012
 Julius Jucikas 2010–2015
 Robertas Javtokas 1996–1997
 Žygimantas Janavičius 2010–2011
 Artūras Jomantas 2004–2006, 2015–2016
 Aurimas Kieža 2006–2008, 2012–2013
 Saulius Kuzminskas 2001–2003, 2007–2009, 2012–2013
 Gintaras Kadžiulis 2008–2009
 Mindaugas Kuzminskas 2008–2010
 Tadas Klimavičius 2005–2007
 Gintaras Leonavičius 2014–2015
 Andrius Mažutis 2005–2007
 Rolandas Matulis 2002
 Gediminas Orelik 2006–2007, 2009–2010
 Giedrius Pečiulionis 1995–2001
 Vaidas Pauliukėnas 1999–2008, 2009–2010
 Virginijus Praškevičius 2007–2009
 Darius Pakamanis 2001–2006, 2006–2007, 2009, 2013–2014
 Edvinas Ruzgas 2010–2012
 Mantas Ruikis 2005–2008
 Donatas Slanina 1993–1999
 Laurynas Samėnas 2009–2010, 2012–2013

 Lithuania (cont):
 Vytautas Šulskis 2012–2015
 Vytautas Šarakauskas 2009–2012
 Gintautas Šivickas 1997
 Andrius Šležas 1996, 1998–1999, 2008–2009
 Arvydas Šikšnius 2009–2010, 2011–2012
 Arvydas Tamkevičius 1994–1999
 Žydrūnas Urbonas 1999–2001, 2002–2003, 2004–2005
 Andrius Vyšniauskas 1999–2000, 2002–2003
 Rolandas Vaičiūnas 1998–2008
 Valdas Vasylius 2011–2012
 Donatas Zavackas 2007–2008
 Mindaugas Žukauskas 1994–1998, 2009–2012
 Eurelijus Žukauskas 1996
 Laurynas Birutis 2017–2018
 USA:
 Jeff Allen 2014–2015
 Rashaun Broadus 2010–2012
 Denzel Bowles 2011–2012
 Brandon Brown 2009–2010
 Chris Cooper 2013–2014
 Stefhon Hannah 2008–2009
 Cameron Long 2011–2012
 Travis Leslie 2014
 Derrick Low 2009–2010
 Derek Needham 2013–2014
 Bambale Osby 2014
 Chase Simon 2012–2013
 David Weaver 2010–2011

Belgium:
Andy Van Vliet 
 Ukraine:
 Michailas Anisimovas 2003–2005
 Roman Gumenyuk 2010–2012, 2015–2016
 Croatia:
 Mario Delaš 2010–2011
 Latvia:
 Raitis Grafs 2009–2010, 2012
 Egypt:
 Assem Marei 2015–2016
 Iceland:
 Elvar Friðriksson 2020–2021

Detailed former players information.

References

External links
 Official website of BC Šiauliai (Lithuanian)
 BC Šiauliai LKL.lt (Lithuanian)
 GeltonaJuoda.lt - the official BC Šiauliai history website (Lithuanian)
 BC Šiauliai BBL.net (English)
 BC Šiauliai EuroCupBasketball.com (English)

 
Basketball teams in Lithuania
Siauliai, BC
Basketball teams established in 1994
1994 establishments in Lithuania